OQ may refer to:

 Chongqing Airlines, IATA code OQ
 Queen Air, a defunct airline and previous user of IATA code OQ
 Royale Airlines, a defunct airline and previous user of IATA code OQ
 One Queensbridge, a supertall skyscraper expected to be built in Melbourne, Australia
 Operational qualification, part of Verification and validation
 A part of the V-Model of systems development
 Officier (Officer) of the National Order of Quebec
 Opera Queensland, Australia
 A range of drones, including the Radioplane OQ-2
 Peckett OQ Class of locomotives
 Orienteering Queensland, a state-level sports body in Australia